Paul Leo Maguire (born August 22, 1938) is a former American professional football player and television sportscaster.

Early sports career
Maguire attended Ursuline High School in Youngstown, Ohio where he was an All State wide receiver and punter; he also played basketball and ran track. He played tight end at The Citadel where he led the nation in touchdown receptions his senior season in 1959 and was named a 3rd Team Associated Press All American; he was recruited by Assistant Coach Al Davis, the future Oakland Raiders owner.

Professional football career
In 1960, Maguire was selected by the Los Angeles Chargers of the American Football League, where he served as both a punter and linebacker. He moved with the team to San Diego in 1961, and stayed there until 1964 when he joined the Buffalo Bills. Maguire was an ace at the "coffin corner" punt. He contributed to three Bills' Eastern Division titles, and their AFL championships in 1964 and 1965. He was involved in one of the most spectacular plays in Bills' history in the 1965 American Football League Championship game against the Chargers. Butch Byrd took a John Hadl punt and with outstanding blocking, took it 74 yards for a touchdown. The last two blocks were by Maguire, crushing two Chargers.

Maguire played in six of the ten American Football League Championship Games — three with the Chargers and three with the Bills, winning three AFL Championship rings, and he was the league's all-time punter in punts and yardage. He was one of only twenty players who were in the AFL for its entire ten-year existence. After his retirement he was inducted into the Youngstown, Ohio Sports Hall of Fame, and the Greater Buffalo Sports Hall of Fame.

Media career
Beginning in the 1970s, Maguire worked as a color commentator on network NFL telecasts, first with NBC and then ESPN. He also called ESPN's telecasts of college football, the Canadian Football League and the now-defunct USFL. Maguire re-joined NBC in 1986 as an analyst on their pregame show, then becoming a color commentator in 1988. Maguire most often worked with Marv Albert on the network's #2 broadcast team for his first seven seasons working for the network. In 1995, Maguire and then-ESPN reporter Phil Simms joined Dick Enberg as the #1 broadcast team for NBC, and remained paired until the end of the 1997 season, when NBC lost the rights to the NFL.

Maguire rejoined ESPN for the 1998 season and became a second color commentator for Sunday Night Football. While there he also served as a color commentator for ABC's Wild Card Saturday games, as the Sunday Night Football team would (usually) broadcast the early game of the day. During the time he was at ESPN, Maguire called playoff games for ABC every year except for 2002, when the network elected to use Brent Musburger and Gary Danielson, its lead college football broadcast team, on Wild Card Saturday.

In 1991, Maguire participated in the WrestleMania VII event. During the broadcast he called George Steinbrenner a "butthead" however the replay was inconclusive.

Maguire, who had a residence in Buffalo after his playing days, hosted a locally produced call-in show called the "Budweiser Sportsline". Later the program was broadcast on the Empire Sports Network.

Maguire worked his last regular season NFL game on January 1, 2006, as the St. Louis Rams and Dallas Cowboys played on ESPN's final Sunday night broadcast. His final NFL game altogether came on January 7, 2006, as he worked the Washington Redskins-Tampa Bay Buccaneers opening round playoff game. However, Maguire was retained by ESPN to serve as a commentator for ABC's college football with Brad Nessler, former Miami Dolphins quarterback Bob Griese, and field reporter Bonnie Bernstein.

In March 2007, Maguire began to serve as an in-studio analyst for ESPN's NFL Live.

Maguire did not return to broadcasting for the 2009 college football season as his broadcast team was split up, with Nessler moving to Saturday night games on ESPN with Todd Blackledge and Griese moving to noon games on ESPN alongside Dave Pasch and Chris Spielman. He later (2009–2010) broadcast games for the then-new United Football League on HDNet, a cable network and streaming service.

See also
List of American Football League players

References

1938 births
American color commentators
American football linebackers
American football punters
Los Angeles Chargers players
San Diego Chargers players
Buffalo Bills players
Living people
The Citadel Bulldogs football players
Canadian Football League announcers
College football announcers
National Football League announcers
United States Football League announcers
Notre Dame Fighting Irish football announcers
Players of American football from Youngstown, Ohio
Buffalo Bills announcers
American Football League players